Çakıllı can refer to:

 Çakıllı
 Çakıllı, Beşiri
 Çakıllı, Bismil
 Çakıllı, Kastamonu
 Çakıllı, Sındırgı